Dulwich and West Norwood  is a constituency in South London created in 1997. It has been represented by Helen Hayes of Labour since her election in 2015.

In the 2016 EU referendum, Dulwich and West Norwood voted to remain in the European Union by an estimated 78%. This was the third highest result in the UK, behind Gibraltar and the neighbouring constituency of Vauxhall.

Boundaries 

1997–2010: The London Borough of Southwark wards of Alleyn, Bellenden, College, Lyndhurst, Ruskin, and Rye, and the London Borough of Lambeth wards of Gipsy Hill, Herne Hill, Knight's Hill, and Thurlow Park.

2010–present: The London Borough of Southwark wards of College, East Dulwich, and Village, and the London Borough of Lambeth wards of Coldharbour, Gipsy Hill, Herne Hill, and Thurlow Park.

Constituency profile
Situated in South East London, the seat takes in all of Herne Hill, Dulwich Village, East Dulwich, Angell Town in Brixton, Gipsy Hill and West Norwood.

The seat is very ethnically diverse: around 25% of the residents are from an Afro-Caribbean background. In addition, 33% of the population live in social housing, and roughly 10% are single parents. 47.6% of residents have a university degree - the fifteenth-highest proportion across all constituencies.

Political history 
The Labour Party has safe majorities of more than a 15% share of the vote since the seat was created in 1997. The runner-up party in four of the seven general elections to date has been the Conservative Party, the Liberal Democrats twice, and the Green Party once.

When the constituency was created for the 1997 election, it was estimated that had the seat existed in 1992, Labour would have won it with a majority of less than 2,000 votes over the second placed Conservatives, making it a marginal seat. The 1997 result therefore suggested that the Conservative vote had halved since the previous election. This performance was poorer than the average fall of the Conservative vote in London and led the Almanac of British Politics to note that there was "now no question of this constituency being marginal."

The constituency takes in the eastern side of Lambeth Council which include the wards of Coldharbour, Herne Hill, Thurlow Park, Gipsy Hill and Knight's Hill. It also takes in the south western end of Southwark Council which encompass Dulwich Village, Goose Green and Dulwich Hill wards. The Green Party have two councillors in constituency and are the official opposition on Lambeth Council. The Labour Party have twenty-one councillors.

Members of Parliament 
The constituency was created in 1997 from parts of the former seats of Dulwich and Norwood. It was represented from its creation until 2015 by the former Secretary of State for Culture (2001–2007), Tessa Jowell.

Election results

Elections in the 2010s
Dulwich and West Norwood was a Unite to Remain constituency, where the Liberal Democrats stood aside in order to back the Green Party. 14% was the largest increase in vote share for any Green candidate at the 2019 General Election.

Elections of the 2000s

Elections of the 1990s

See also 
List of parliamentary constituencies in London
Lambeth local elections
Southwark local elections

References

External links 
Politics Resources (Election results from 1922 onwards)
Electoral Calculus (Election results from 1955 onwards)

Politics of the London Borough of Lambeth
Politics of the London Borough of Southwark
Parliamentary constituencies in London
Constituencies of the Parliament of the United Kingdom established in 1997
Parliamentary constituency, Dulwich and West Norwood